The 14th G7 Summit was held in Toronto, Ontario, Canada between June 19 and 21, 1988. The venue for the summit meetings was the Metro Toronto Convention Centre in Downtown Toronto.

The Group of Seven (G7) was an unofficial forum which brought together the heads of the richest industrialized countries: France, West Germany, Italy, Japan, the United Kingdom, the United States, Canada (since 1976), and the President of the European Commission (starting officially in 1981). The summits were not meant to be linked formally with wider international institutions; and in fact, a mild rebellion against the stiff formality of other international meetings was a part of the genesis of cooperation between France's president Valéry Giscard d'Estaing and West Germany's chancellor Helmut Schmidt as they conceived the first Group of Six (G6) summit in 1975.

Unlike the relatively low key summit at Château Montebello in 1981, the Toronto summit was held under tight security with involvement of the Royal Canadian Mounted Police (RCMP) and Metro Toronto Police.

Canada was the first member of the G7 or G8 to host both this kind of Summit and an Olympic Games in the same calendar year. In February, Calgary, Alberta, hosted the 1988 Winter Olympics. Canada would do this again 22 years later when they hosted the 2010 Winter Olympics in Vancouver, British Columbia and then the 36th G8 summit and the 4th G20 summit in Huntsville, Ontario and Toronto respectively.

Leaders at the summit

The G7 is an unofficial annual forum for the leaders of Canada, the European Commission, France, Germany, Italy, Japan, the United Kingdom and the United States.
   
The 14th G7 summit was the first summit for Italian Prime Minister Ciriaco De Mita and was the last summit for US President Ronald Reagan. It was also the first and only summit for Japanese Prime Minister Noboru Takeshita.

Participants
These summit participants are the current "core members" of the international forum:

Issues
The summit was intended as a venue for resolving differences among its members. As a practical matter, the summit was also conceived as an opportunity for its members to give each other mutual encouragement in the face of difficult economic decisions. Issues which were discussed at this summit included:
 International Economic Policy Cooperation
 Multilateral Trading System / Uruguay Round
 Newly Industrialized Economies
 Developing Countries and Debt
 Environment
 Future Summits
 Other Issues
 Annex on Structural Reform

Criticism
The Toronto-based Canadian Organization for the Rights of Prostitutes issued a number of press releases leading up to the economic summit pointing out that the local vice squads were tasked with cleaning up the city streets through a coordinated crackdown on sex workers. This crackdown and economic summit took place in Toronto amidst the tumultuous restructuring of the Canadian Criminal Code to outlaw commercial sex by criminalizing communication for the purpose of obtaining commercial sexual services in public. Similar crackdowns against other street-involved communities (drug users, the homeless, gays and lesbians, transgender people) continue today in the lead up to large economic summits like the G7, IMF, World Bank as well as sporting events like the World Cup, the Olympics, and Formula One.

Gallery

See also
 2010 G20 Toronto summit
 G8

Notes

References
 Bayne, Nicholas and Robert D. Putnam. (2000).  Hanging in There: The G7 and G8 Summit in Maturity and Renewal. Aldershot, Hampshire, England: Ashgate Publishing. ; OCLC 43186692
 Reinalda, Bob and Bertjan Verbeek. (1998).  Autonomous Policy Making by International Organizations. London: Routledge.  ; ;

External links
 No official website is created for any G7 summit prior to 1995 -- see the 21st G7 summit.
 University of Toronto: G8 Research Group, G8 Information Centre
  G7 1988, delegations & documents
 CBC Digital Archives:  "Leaders arrive at 1988 G7 Summit in Toronto," Broadcast Date: June 18, 1988.

G7 summit
G7 summit
1988 in international relations
1988 in Toronto
G7 summit 1988
G7 summit 1988
1988
June 1988 events in Canada